Lino Arruda is a Brazilian artist, illustrator, graphic novelist, and researcher. He is known for the autobiographical comic book Monstrans: Experiencing Horrormones, which was awarded by Itaú Cultural's Itaú Rumos fund. The work received the MixBrasil award, in 2021, in the category of best LGBTQIA+ book of the year and is a finalist for the Golden Crown Literary Society's 2022 Goldie awards, in the non-fiction category.

Arruda is a trans man and often writes and researches on LGBTQIA+ topics. He earned a master's degree in Art History and a doctorate in Literature and both processes inspired his artistic productions. In addition to Monstrans, the artist has also published the zines Anomalina (2014), Novo Corte de Peitos (2018), Quimer(d)a (2015) and Sapatoons (2011). He currently writes the transfuturist comic CISFORIA: The worst of both worlds with the support of the ProAC fund.

See also 

 LGBT themes in comics
 Brazilian comics
 List of fictional trans characters
 List of transgender publications

References

External links 

 Official website

Brazilian LGBT writers
Transgender men
Brazilian male artists
Brazilian illustrators
Transgender writers
Transgender artists
LGBT comics creators
Year of birth missing (living people)
Living people